Eknathrao alias Balasaheb Vikhe Patil (10 April 1932 – 30 December 2016) was a member of the 14th Lok Sabha of India. He represented the Kopargaon and Ahmednagar (South) constituency of Maharashtra and was a member of the Indian National Congress (INC) political party. He later joined Shivsena. He was a minister in the NDA. He was a prominent leader of Maharashtra and eldest son of Vithalrao Vikhe Patil, who started Asia's first Co-operative sugar factory at Loni in Maharashtra. He was awarded the prestigious civilian award Padma Bhushan on 31 March 2010 for his outstanding work in the field of Social Work.
He was seven time MP, former Union Minister of State (Finance) and Union Cabinet Minister (Heavy Industries), Government of India.

Awards
 The Jeevan Sadhana Gaurav Award from Pune University for lifetime achievement in the field of education and rural development in 2007
 Padma Bhushan by Government of India on 31 March 2010 for his outstanding work in the field of Social Work.
 D.Sc - Doctor of Science Award awarded in the year 2013 by Mahatma Phule Krishi Vidyapeeth, Rahuri.

References

External links
 Official biographical sketch in Parliament of India website

1932 births
2016 deaths
Shiv Sena politicians
Marathi politicians
Social workers from Maharashtra
People from Maharashtra
Indian National Congress politicians from Maharashtra
Lok Sabha members from Maharashtra
India MPs 2004–2009
India MPs 1999–2004
India MPs 1998–1999
India MPs 1989–1991
India MPs 1984–1989
India MPs 1980–1984
India MPs 1977–1979
India MPs 1971–1977
Pro tem Speakers of the Lok Sabha
Recipients of the Padma Bhushan in social work
People from Ahmednagar district
Social workers